Marian Filipiuk (born 2 February 1941) is a Polish sprinter. He competed in the men's 4 × 400 metres relay at the 1964 Summer Olympics.

References

1941 births
Living people
Athletes (track and field) at the 1964 Summer Olympics
Polish male sprinters
Olympic athletes of Poland
Place of birth missing (living people)